Dissident Prophet is an apocalyptic indie rock band from Birmingham, England. They have released six albums so far; We're Not Grasshoppers, in 1996; with a follow-up, 21st Century Spin (as Maccabees), released in 2002; Modern Man (as Maccabees), in 2005; Weapons of Mass Deception, in 2012; Red Moon Rising, in 2015. Their most recent album, Strange Days released on 24 October 2017.

History

1994–1997: We're Not Grasshoppers
The band were signed by MGL Granite records after their second gig. Their sound is rooted in indie rock, and they have built a strong following through their live performances. Their debut single, "Generation X", was released on MGL records in 2004. They received widespread acclaim with single  "Generation X", and multiple plays from the likes of BBC Radio 1's Mark Radcliffe and Johnnie Walker, Virgin, GLR, as well as MTV video coverage. The band toured nationally and supported numerous bands such as Babylon Zoo, Stiff Little Fingers, Ocean Colour Scene and Fish and received rave reviews in the likes of Melody Maker and Kerrang! ("Best Newcomers").
The band followed with "Unconditional Love" and "Hang Him Round Your Neck" before the release of their first album We're Not Grasshoppers.
MGL Granite records went bust soon after We're Not Grasshoppers was released, so the band didn't receive the support it needed to gain mainstream success.

2001–2006: Maccabees NOT The Maccabees
In 2001, the band regrouped, with Collin Burton replacing Simon Jason Smith on bass, Dave Odart replacing John Large on drums, and Melanie J. joining them on keyboards/vocals. A friend, Mike Doughty made an animated music video for their song "Man From The Sky".
In 2002, with the band line-up change, they decided to take on the name Maccabees with the release of 21st Century Spin, which did well in the United States. "With 21st Century Spin, the unbashful Maccabees don't just remind us of Britain's immense musical talents, they prove that they're among them…with a head high above ground, profoundly aware of what's going on."
In 2005, due to family commitments, Dave Odart was replaced by Robbie Maxwell on drums. Modern Man was released. The band name Maccabees caused confusion with The Maccabees (an indie rock band from Brighton), who went on to achieve mainstream success around the same time. That same year, most of the original band line-up were head-hunted (Simon Jason Smith, John Large, Tom Livemore) to play for Carina Round, as she toured America following her record deal with Interscope. With Tom Livemore's departure to Hollywood, Andy's friend Tom Rankin took over lead guitar duties for a few shows. At the end of the year the band took a hiatus.

2012–present: Dissident Return
In 2012, Dissident Prophet returned to the music scene. Andy & Melanie's kids had now finished school; Tom was back from Hollywood; and Robbie had bought a new drum kit. Due to the confusion with mainstream band The Maccabees, Dissident Prophet reverted to their original name, and released a free download album Weapons of Mass Deception, available from their Bandcamp page. Andy says: "WMD reflects an urgent call to awaken our minds and see through the veneer of falseness proclaimed as truth everywhere in society. There is a spiritual war, and we refuse to keep quiet about it."
In 2013, tracks from Weapons of Mass Deception appeared with Andrew Marston on BBC Hereford & Worcester; received airplay on various Cross Rhythms Radio stations; major rotation on WeAre1Radio  an online radio rock station, serving Latin America based in Bogotá, Colombia. Tracks were also played on "Tommy's Rock And Metal Mayhem" show on Ipswich Community Radio (ICR) in the UK, and get continued airplay on the show. The band also took part in the WeAre1 Radio's online 'War of the Bands II' contest. The band were also welcomed into the Great Malvern gig scene; Played alongside Andy Wickett World Service; and ended the year with the Paul Poulton Project supported them at The Kitchen Garden in Kings Heath, Birmingham, UK.
In 2015, Red Moon Rising released on 29 June 2015. Age of Deceit series documentary filmmaker and FaceLikeTheSun YouTube vlogger, Gonzo Shimura produced a music video for the song "Human 2.0", which received over 16,000 views in its first week of upload. Andy put together a song-by-song look at Red Moon Rising. The band performed twice at Creation Fest a free Christian music festival, which took place on the first weekend of August in the Royal Cornwall Showground, Cornwall, England. And performed at KingsStock, Moggerhanger Park, which took place on the last weekend of August.

Discography

LPs
 We're Not Grasshoppers (1996)
 21st Century Spin (2002)
 Modern Man (as Maccabees, 2005)
 Weapons of Mass Deception (2012)
 Red Moon Rising (2015)
 Strange Days (2017)

EPs
 Limited Edition (1995)

Singles
 "Generation X" (1995)
 "Unconditional Love" (1996)
 "Hang Him Round Your Neck" (1996)
 "Let It Go" (1996)
 "My Friends" (1996)

References

External links
 Official website
 
 
 Dissident Prophet review by The Phantom Tollbooth
 

English indie rock groups
Musical groups from Birmingham, West Midlands